Poompat Sapkulchananart (born 18 October 1983) is a badminton player from Thailand. He was the national championships in 2006, and in the same year, he represented his country at the Asian Games. In 2007, he won the Smiling Fish Asian Satellite in the men's singles event. He also help the Thai team to win gold at the 2007 Summer Universiade, and at the individual event, he won the men's singles bronze.

References

External links 
 

Poompat Sapkulchananart
1983 births
Living people
Badminton players at the 2006 Asian Games
Poompat Sapkulchananart
Competitors at the 2005 Southeast Asian Games
Competitors at the 2007 Southeast Asian Games
Poompat Sapkulchananart
Southeast Asian Games medalists in badminton
Universiade gold medalists for Thailand
Universiade bronze medalists for Thailand
Universiade medalists in badminton
Medalists at the 2007 Summer Universiade
Poompat Sapkulchananart